German submarine U-99 was a Type VIIB U-boat of Nazi Germany's Kriegsmarine during World War II. She was laid down on 31 March 1939 at the Friedrich Krupp Germaniawerft in Kiel as yard number 593. She was launched on 12 March 1940 under the command of Korvettenkapitän Otto Kretschmer and was assigned to the 7th U-boat Flotilla based in Kiel and later in St Nazaire.

She damaged five more ships and took one vessel as a prize.

Design
German Type VIIB submarines were preceded by the shorter Type VIIA submarines. U-99 had a displacement of  when at the surface and  while submerged. She had two shafts and two  propellers.

U-99 was fitted with five  torpedo tubes (four fitted at the bow and one at the stern), fourteen torpedoes, one  SK C/35 naval gun, 220 rounds, and one  anti-aircraft gun The boat had a complement of between forty-four and sixty.

Service history
From April to June 1940, the crew of U-99 were under training, based at Kiel and St. Nazaire.

First patrol
On 18 June, U-99 departed Kiel for operations in the North Sea west of Norway. An Arado Ar-196 seaplane from the German battlecruiser  attacked her, having mistaken her for a British submarine. Two days later, U-99 was attacked by two aircraft; minor damage was inflicted. She returned to Kiel on 25 June.

Second patrol
U-99 departed Wilhelmshaven on 27 June to patrol southwest of Ireland. On 29 June, she was attacked by British aircraft. A crash dive was carried out with the result that the boat hit the seabed, causing some damage which was able to be repaired. On this patrol U-99 sank six ships and captured one, the Estonian  cargo steamship Merisaar, carrying a load of timber from New Orleans, to Cork, Ireland.) On 8 July, over 100 depth charges were dropped by the escorts of Convoy HX 53, but U-99 escaped undamaged. The patrol ended on 21 July.

 † Convoy HX 52, ‡ Convoy HX 53, * sunk by German bombing, 15 July 1940

Third patrol
On 25 July, U-99 departed Lorient for the North Atlantic. Four ships were sunk and three others damaged. On the 31st, the escorts of Convoy OB 191 dropped 20 depth charges on the boat without effect. Later that evening, a flying boat also attacked her, again without causing any damage. The patrol ended on 5 August.

† Convoy OB 191, ‡ Damaged

Fourth patrol
U-99 departed Lorient on 4 September for the North Atlantic; seven ships were sunk. The patrol ended on the 25th. U-99 was slightly damaged in an air raid on Lorient on 27 September.

† Convoy SC 3, ‡ Convoy HX 71, * Convoy HX 72

Fifth patrol
On 13 October, U-99 departed Lorient to patrol the North West Approaches. Six ships from Convoy SC 7 were sunk and another was damaged. The patrol ended on 22 October.

Sixth patrol
U-99 departed Lorient for the North West Approaches on 30 October 1940; four ships were sunk. The patrol ended on 8 November.

† Convoy HX 83

Seventh patrol
On 27 November, U-99 departed Lorient for the North Atlantic. Four ships were sunk. The patrol ended on 12 December.

† Convoy HX 90, ‡ Convoy OB 252

Eighth patrol
U-99 departed Lorient on 22 February 1941 to patrol in the North Atlantic; eight ships were sunk. U-99 was attacked herself, with severe damage inflicted. Kretschmer surrendered and scuttled the submarine with the loss of three lives.

† Convoy OB 293, ‡ Convoy HX 112

Fate
On 17 March 1941, U-99 had just fired the last of her torpedoes and sunk Korshamn when the Watch Officer spotted a destroyer, southeast of Iceland in approximate position . U-99 was driven deep by the attack but was nonetheless severely damaged. Kretschmer had no choice but to surface; immediately a barrage of fire greeted the boat. Kretschmer sent a message to Donald Macintyre, Walkers captain, "CAPTAIN TO CAPTAIN. I AM SUNKING [sic] PLEASE RESCUE MY CREW." He then ordered that the boat should be scuttled. Forty crew, including Kretschmer, were rescued to become POWs. Three crewmen – the engineering-officer and two ratings – lost their lives. The engineering officer re-entered the sinking U-boat and perished while opening the galley hatch, to hasten the boat's sinking and prevent the British from boarding it.

Macintyre took Kretschmer's binoculars as a souvenir. But in 1955, he gave them back to Kretschmer.

Wolfpack operations
U-99 operated with the following Wolfpacks during her career:
Wolfpack 1 (20 – 22 September 1940)
Wolfpack 2 (17 – 19 October 1940)

Summary of raiding history

See also
 List of successful U-boats
 Operation Kiebitz

References

Notes

Citations

Bibliography

External links
 
 uboataces.com webpage with insignia for U-99
 uboatarchive.net U-99 Interrogation of Survivors, Naval Intelligence Division, April 1941

1940 ships
German Type VIIB submarines
Ships built in Kiel
U-boats commissioned in 1940
U-boats scuttled in 1941
U-boats sunk by British warships
World War II shipwrecks in the Atlantic Ocean
World War II submarines of Germany
Maritime incidents in March 1941